Jong Yong-ok (born 24 January 1981) is a North Korean long-distance runner who specializes in the marathon.

She finished 20th at the 2000 Olympic Games, 21st at the 2004 Olympic Games, 14th at the 2005 World Championships and 36th at the 2008 Olympic Games. She also finished sixth at the 2006 Asian Games, won the 2001 and 2007 Pyongyang Marathons and won the bronze medal (in half marathon) at the 2007 Summer Universiade.

Her personal best time is 2:26:02 hours, achieved at the 2007 Pyongyang Marathon. This is also the meet record.

Achievements

References

1981 births
Living people
North Korean female marathon runners
Athletes (track and field) at the 2000 Summer Olympics
Athletes (track and field) at the 2004 Summer Olympics
Athletes (track and field) at the 2008 Summer Olympics
Olympic athletes of North Korea
Athletes (track and field) at the 2006 Asian Games
Universiade medalists in athletics (track and field)
Universiade bronze medalists for North Korea
Asian Games competitors for North Korea